de Villepin is a surname. Notable people with the surname include:

 Dominique de Villepin (born 1953), French politician and Prime Minister of France
 Marie de Villepin (born 1986), French model, actress and singer
 Xavier de Villepin (1926–2014), French politician

French-language surnames